Josef Vlastimil Burian, better known as Vlasta Burian, (9 April 1891, in Liberec – 31 January 1962, in Prague) was an internationally renowned Czechoslovak film and stage actor, singer, comedian, footballer and film director. In the Czech Republic, he is known as Král komiků (King of Comedians).

Biography

He is well known in the Czech Republic for his comic roles in many movies before and during World War II. His films are still shown regularly on Czech television, being particularly popular around Christmas time. He ran a popular comic theater until 1944, when the Nazis closed down all Czech-language theaters.

After the war Burian was charged and convicted of collaboration with the Nazis. He was briefly imprisoned, and then not permitted to return to the stage until 1950. He was officially exonerated of all charges in 1994.

His famous movie partner was Jaroslav Marvan, with whom he made the following films:

 To neznáte Hadimršku
 Funebrák
 Anton Špelec, ostrostřelec
 Pobočník Jeho Výsosti
 Revizor
 Hrdinný kapitán Korkorán
 Nezlobte dědečka
 Hrdina jedné noci
 U pokladny stál...
 Ulice zpívá
 Katakomby
 Baron Prášil
 Přednosta stanice
 Provdám svou ženu
 Ryba na suchu
 Zlaté dno

Early career

Before getting established in his acting and film career, Burian played as a professional football goalkeeper firstly for Viktoria Žižkov and then for AC Sparta Prague from 1916 to 1926.

References

External links

 Biography (in Czech)
 
 Photographs of Vlasta Burian

1891 births
1962 deaths
Actors from Liberec
People from the Kingdom of Bohemia
Czechoslovak male actors
Association football goalkeepers
Czechoslovak footballers
FK Viktoria Žižkov players
AC Sparta Prague players
Burials at Vyšehrad Cemetery
Sportspeople from Liberec